Rudy Jahchan is the co-producer and star of the internet shows Galacticast, A Comicbook Orange, and Kitkast. The primary writer and director of the shows, he managed the technical aspects such as devising the special effects and developing their websites, and co-starred alongside Casey McKinnon.

Education and early career
Born in Bahrain, and raised there and Canada, Rudy took his B.Sc. in Computer Science at McGill University, graduating with distinction in 2000, and pursued a career in software and web development.

Web series
Rudy Jahchan first became known under the pseudonym “Zod”, the man behind the scenes of video blog Kitkast. It debuted on October 15, 2005, and received an average 40,000 weekly viewers by the end of its run in March 2006.

He next launched Galacticast as a weekly science fiction parody show on May 8, 2006. Becoming known for its Robot Chicken like fan-based humor, and recreation of Hollywood effects with minimal budget, it has a following of over a quarter million viewers a month. Highlighted by the BBC, the Montreal Gazette, and the Hollywood Reporter, on November 5, 2006 Galacticast won five Vloggies including the People’s Choice for Best Special Effects, Best Entertainment, and Best Website.

His most recent project was A Comicbook Orange, a review show for comics and graphic novels.

Awards

References

External links
Rudy Jahchan's Official Web Site
GALACTICAST - Weekly Sci Fi Parody Show
A COMICBOOK ORANGE - Comicbook review show
KITKAST - Former show

Video bloggers
1979 births
Living people
McGill University alumni
Canadian bloggers